Paul Leonard Briggs (April 18, 1920 – February 14, 2011) was an American football tackle who played one season with the Detroit Lions of the National Football League. He was drafted by the Detroit Lions in the seventh round of the 1944 NFL Draft. He played college football at the University of Colorado and attended Grand Junction High School in Grand Junction, Colorado. Briggs was the head football coach of Bakersfield High School in Bakersfield, California from 1953 to 1985. He was head coach of Rocky Ford High School in Rocky Ford, Colorado from 1949 to 1950 and head coach of Natrona County High School from 1951 to 1952. Briggs was also an assistant coach at Orange Coast College from 1985 to 2005. He was inducted into the University of Colorado Hall of Honor in 1974, Citizens Athletic Foundation High School Hall of Fame in 1975, California Coaches Association Hall of Fame in 1977, Bob Elias Kern County Sports Hall of Fame in 1978 and Bakersfield High School Football Hall of Fame in 2006. He joined the United States Navy in 1943 and was stationed on the USS Daly. Briggs earned a Bronze Star and Purple Heart after being hit in the nose and back by shrapnel during a Japanese kamikaze attack.

References

External links
Just Sports Stats
Coach Paul Briggs Scholarship Fund

1920 births
2011 deaths
Players of American football from Providence, Rhode Island
American football tackles
Colorado Buffaloes football players
Detroit Lions players
United States Navy personnel of World War II